Turin is a town in Coweta County, Georgia, United States. The population was 274 at the 2010 census. It is part of the Atlanta metropolitan area.

History
The Georgia General Assembly incorporated Turin as a town in 1890. The town's name is a transfer from Turin, in Italy.

Geography

Turin is located in eastern Coweta County at  (33.326798, -84.634064). The town of Sharpsburg is immediately to the northwest. Georgia State Route 16 passes through the town, leading northwest  to Newnan, the county seat, and southeast  to Senoia.

Demographics

As of the census of 2000, there were 165 people, 66 households, and 51 families residing in the town. The racial makeup of the town was 69.09% White and 30.91% African American. Hispanic or Latino people of any race were 1.21% of the population.

There were 66 households, out of which 24.2% had children under the age of 18 living with them, 51.5% were married couples living together, 22.7% had a female householder with no husband present, and 22.7% were non-families. 21.2% of all households were made up of individuals, and 10.6% had someone living alone who was 65 years of age or older. The average household size was 2.50 and the average family size was 2.86.

In the town, the population was spread out, with 18.8% under the age of 18, 13.3% from 18 to 24, 23.6% from 25 to 44, 23.6% from 45 to 64, and 20.6% who were 65 years of age or older. The median age was 41 years. For every 100 females, there were 85.4 males. For every 100 females age 18 and over, there were 86.1 males.

The median income for a household in the town was $50,000, and the median income for a family was $55,375. Males had a median income of $23,125 versus $21,771 for females. The per capita income for the town was $19,994. About 1.9% of families and 7.3% of the population were below the poverty line, including 12.5% of those under the age of eighteen and 10.0% of those 65 or over.

References

Towns in Coweta County, Georgia
Towns in Georgia (U.S. state)